Misteguay Creek is a tributary of the Flint River,  long, on the central Lower Peninsula of Michigan in the United States. Via the Flint and Shiawassee rivers, it is part of the watershed of the Saginaw River, which flows to Saginaw Bay of Lake Huron. Via Lake Huron and the Great Lakes system, it is part of the larger watershed of the St. Lawrence River.

It flows initially northwestward into Shiawassee County, then generally northward, through Venice and Hazelton townships and the village of New Lothrop in Shiawassee County; and Maple Grove, Albee, and Spaulding townships in Saginaw County. Several sections of the creek's course have been channelized.

Tributaries
This is a list of named streams in Misteguay Creek's watershed, as identified by the National Hydrography Dataset.  By default, the list is ordered from the mouth of the creek to its source.

See also
List of rivers of Michigan

References 

Rivers of Michigan
Rivers of Genesee County, Michigan
Rivers of Saginaw County, Michigan
Rivers of Shiawassee County, Michigan
Tributaries of Lake Huron